Onin may refer to:
 Ōnin, a Japanese era
 Ōnin War
 Onin peninsula, on the Bomberai Peninsula of Indonesian Papua
 Onin language, an Austronesian language spoken on the peninsula